Viļāni Parish is an administrative unit of Rēzekne Municipality in the Latgale region of Latvia.

Parishes of Latvia
Rēzekne Municipality
Latgale